The Fulbright–Hays Act of 1961 is officially known as the Mutual Educational and Cultural Exchange Act of 1961. It was marshalled by United States Senator J. William Fulbright (D-AR) and passed by the 87th United States Congress on September 16, 1961, the same month the Foreign Assistance Act of 1961 and Peace Corps Act of 1961 were enacted.

The legislation was enacted into law by the president John F. Kennedy on September 21, 1961.

Purpose
As the preamble of the Fulbright–Hays Act of 1961 states:
The purpose of this chapter is to enable the Government of the United States to increase mutual understanding between the people of the United States and the people of other countries by means of educational and cultural exchange; to strengthen the ties which unite us with other nations by demonstrating the educational and cultural interests, developments, and achievements of the people of the United States and other nations, and the contributions being made toward a peaceful and more fruitful life for people throughout the world; to promote international cooperation for educational and cultural advancement; and thus to assist in the development of friendly, sympathetic, and peaceful relations between the United States and the other countries of the world.

U.S. Congressional Amendments to 1961 Act
Chronological legislation relative to U.S. Congressional revisions as pertaining to the Mutual Educational and Cultural Exchange Act.

See also

 Bureau of Educational and Cultural Affairs
 FRIENDSHIP Act of 1993
 Fulbright Program
 United States Information and Educational Exchange Act of 1948

References

External links
 Mutual Educational and Cultural Exchange Act of 1961
 Fulbright Program
 
 
 

1961 in law
1961 in American law
87th United States Congress
1961 in the United States
1961 in international relations
United States foreign relations legislation